{{Infobox cricket tournament main
| name = Nottinghamshire Cricket Board Premier League
| image = 
| imagesize = 200px
| caption = 
| country = 
| administrator = ECB
| cricket format = Limited Overs
| first = 1999 (ECB Premier League)
| last = 
| next = 
| tournament format = League
| participants = 12 (Premier League)
| champions = Cavaliers and Carrington CC
| trophyholder = 
| most successful = West Indian Cavaliers CC (9)
| qualification = 
| most runs = 
| most wickets =
| website = https://nottinghamshirecbpl.play-cricket.com/
| current = 
}}
The Nottinghamshire Cricket Board Premier League''' is the top level of competition for recreational club cricket in Nottinghamshire, England, and since it was formed in 1999 it has been a designated ECB Premier League.

It has two feeder leagues serving the North and South of the county:
 Bassetlaw and District Cricket League – North
 South Nottinghamshire Cricket League – South

The early years of the league were dominated by West Indian Cavaliers, who were champions in nine of the first fifteen seasons of competition. After the 2017 season the club entered into a merger and became Cavaliers and Carrington.

The league attracts many top players, notable stars include: Alex Tudor, Saqlain Mushtaq, Usman Afzaal and Bilal Shafayat.

Winners

Premier League performance by season from 1999

References

External links
 

English domestic cricket competitions
Cricket in Nottinghamshire
ECB Premier Leagues